Codophila is a genus of 'shield bugs' belonging to the subfamily Pentatominae in the family Pentatomidae.

Species
 Codophila maculicollis (Dallas, 1851)
 Codophila varia (Fabricius, 1787)

External links
 Fauna Europaea
 Biolib

Pentatomidae genera
Pentatomini